Gilbert Alan Hamilton Wills, 1st Baron Dulverton (28 March 1880 – 1 December 1956), also known same Sir Gilbert Wills, 2nd Baronet of Northmoor & Manor Heath, was a British businessman and Conservative Member of Parliament from 1909 to 1929.

Family

Wills was the son of Sir Frederick Wills, 1st Baronet, and his wife Annie (née Hamilton). The Wills family were part owners of W. D. & H. O. Wills, tobacco importers and cigarette manufacturers, which later became part of Imperial Tobacco. Wills was President of the latter company and also served as a Member of Parliament for Taunton from 1912 to 1918 and for Weston-super-Mare from 1918 to 1922. In the 1929 Dissolution Honours he was raised to the peerage as Baron Dulverton, of Batsford in the County of Gloucester.

Lord Dulverton married Victoria May, daughter of Sir Edward Chichester, 9th Baronet, in 1914. He died in December 1956, aged 76, and was succeeded in his titles by his son Anthony.

Notes

References
Kidd, Charles, Williamson, David (editors). Debrett's Peerage and Baronetage (1990 edition). New York: St Martin's Press, 1990.

External links 

1880 births
1956 deaths
Barons in the Peerage of the United Kingdom
Wills, Gilbert
Wills, Gilbert
Wills, Gilbert
UK MPs who were granted peerages
Businesspeople in the tobacco industry
Barons created by George V
Gilbert